James Everett Livingston (born January 12, 1940) is a retired United States Marine major general. He was awarded the United States' highest military decoration, the Medal of Honor, for heroic actions in 1968 during the Vietnam War. Livingston served on active duty in the Marine Corps over 33 years before retiring on September 1, 1995. His last assignment was the Commanding General of Marine Forces Reserve in New Orleans, Louisiana.

Early life
James Livingston was born on January 12, 1940, in Towns, Georgia. He graduated from Lumber City High School in 1957. He entered North Georgia College and State University (The Military College of Georgia) in 1957 and was a member of the school's nationally recognized Corps of Cadets until he transferred to pursue a major that the school did not offer. In 1962, Livingston earned a Bachelor of Science degree in civil engineering from Auburn University. While at Auburn University he pledged and was initiated into the Alpha-Delta chapter of Sigma Pi fraternity. He was commissioned a second lieutenant in the United States Marine Corps in June 1962.

United States Marine Corps
Livingston's early assignments included service as a platoon commander, intelligence officer and as a Recruit Training Regiment series commander. Promoted to captain in June 1966, Livingston served as the Commanding Officer of the Marine detachment aboard the Aircraft Carrier , before joining the 3rd Marine Division in the Republic of Vietnam in August 1967.

On May 2, 1968, while serving as Commanding Officer, Company E, 2nd Battalion, 4th Marines, Livingston distinguished himself above and beyond the call of duty in action against enemy forces during the Battle of Dai Do, and earned the Medal of Honor. He returned to the United States in November 1968 and completed the Amphibious Warfare School in Quantico, Virginia. He was presented the Medal of Honor on May 14, 1970, by President Richard Nixon.

After his second tour in Vietnam, Livingston served as an instructor at the United States Army Infantry School, Director of Division Schools for the 1st Marine Division, and later, as S-3 of the 3rd Battalion, 7th Marines. In March 1975 he returned to Vietnam and served as Operations Officer for the Vietnam evacuation operations, which included Operation Frequent Wind, the evacuation of Saigon. Livingston graduated from Marine Corps Command and Staff College in May 1977. Livingston then commanded the Marine Barracks, United Kingdom, London. In 1980 Livingston was selected to attend the Air War College and graduated with a Master's degree in 1981. After graduation, he returned to the Marine Corps Recruit Depot, Parris Island and served as Commanding Officer, 3rd Recruit Training Battalion. He was next assigned as the Assistant Chief of Staff for Operations and Training at the Marine Recruit Depot, Parris Island, South Carolina. During this period, he earned a master's degree in management from Webster University in 1984. He then assumed command of 6th Marines, 2nd Marine Division from February 8, 1986, to June 24, 1987. His next assignment was before the Joint United States Assistance Group in the Republic of the Philippines. 

Following advancement to brigadier general on June 10, 1988, Livingston served as Deputy Director for Operations at the National Military Command Center in Washington, D.C. During Operations Desert Shield and Desert Storm, Livingston commanded the Marine Air Ground Combat Center, 29 Palms, California and developed the Desert Warfare Training Program. After command of the 1st Marine Expeditionary Brigade, he was advanced to major general on July 8, 1991, and assumed command of the 4th Marine Division. In July 1992, he assumed command of the newly created Marine Reserve Force, and continued through its reorganization in October 1994, with its new title, "Marine Forces Reserve".

Livingston is a graduate of the Amphibious Warfare School, the Marine Corps Command and Staff College and the Air War College.

Retirement
In retirement, Livingston serves on the board of trustees of the National World War II Museum. On November 6, 2007, the Fred Thompson presidential campaign announced that Livingston would serve as the National Co-Chair of Veterans for Fred Thompson. He is also a political supporter of Jeb Bush and in December 2015 was featured in an ad called "Honor" in which he referred to President Barack Obama as a "Commander-in-Chief [who] requires training wheels." He wrote his autobiography, Noble Warrior: The Story of Maj. Gen. James E. Livingston, Medal of Honor. with historians Colin D. Heaton and Anne-Marie Lewis. It was placed on the Commandant of the Marine Corps reading list in 2011.

Military awards
Livingston's  decorations and awards include:

Medal of Honor citation
The President of the United States in the name of The Congress takes pleasure in presenting the MEDAL OF HONOR to
CAPTAIN JAMES E. LIVINGSTON
UNITED STATES MARINE CORPS
for service as set forth in the following CITATION:

/S/ RICHARD M. NIXON

Silver Star citation
Citation:

Honors
On November 19, 1993, the State of Georgia dedicated a historical marker in Lumber City, Georgia, honoring Livingston and his Medal of Honor actions.

See also

List of Medal of Honor recipients for the Vietnam War

Notes

References
Autobiography: Noble warrior: The Story of Major General James E. Livingston, USMC (Ret.), Medal of Honor, with Colin D. Heaton and Anne Marie Lewis. Zenith Press, 2010.  

 Official biography, United States Marine Corps
 Major General James E. Livingston, USMC, Who's Who in Marine Corps History, History Division, United States Marine Corps.
 Medal of Honor citation
 James Livingston, American Valor, PBS. (URL accessed April 22, 2006)
 Interview at the Pritzker Military Museum & Library on March 20, 2008
 Interview at the Pritzker Military Museum & Library on April 7, 2011
 

1940 births
Living people
Auburn University alumni
United States Marine Corps Medal of Honor recipients
Recipients of the Navy Distinguished Service Medal
Recipients of the Silver Star
Recipients of the Gallantry Cross (Vietnam)
United States Marine Corps generals
United States Marine Corps personnel of the Vietnam War
People from Telfair County, Georgia
Recipients of the Defense Superior Service Medal
Vietnam War recipients of the Medal of Honor